The Bus Services Industry Act 2015 is a statute of the Parliament of Singapore that provide for the Land Transport Authority (LTA) to take over the regulation of the operators of bus services, depots and interchanges from the Public Transport Council (PTC).

Overview
The Bus Services Industry Act caters for the Government owning the buses and allows the Land Transport Authority in responding more expeditiously regarding changes in travel demand. Operators that will be running bus services as contractors can also be removed if they do not meet standards. Routes are tendered to operators to operate, while revenue risk is supposedly being borne by the state.

Uses of the Act

Under the Bus Services Industry Act, the difference between what the Government of Singapore collects in fares and the amounts it pays operators will be covered by subsidies. This may impact fare review mechanism that is pre-existing, in which the public transport operators may be expected to apply for fare changes annually.

See also
Public Transport Council (Amendment) Act 2015

References

External links
Bus Services Industry Act 2015

2016 in law
2016 in Singapore
Bus transport in Singapore
Singaporean legislation
History of transport in Singapore
Transport legislation
2016 in transport